Reg Bamford (born 11 October 1967 in Cape Town, South Africa) is a croquet world champion from London, England. Although resident in England, he plays croquet for his native South Africa.

Since 2001, he has dominated world croquet. He is the only player to have won both versions of the World Championships (Golf Croquet and Association Croquet) and held both titles simultaneously in 2013. He has won the Association Croquet World Croquet Championship five times (2001, 2005, 2009, 2012 and 2020), and the WCF World Golf Croquet Championship twice (2013 and 2017). He was runner-up on two occasions (2018 in AC and 2012 in GC) and semi-finalist on two occasions (2014 and 2016 in AC). He has won the British AC Open Championship 12 times and the British GC Open Championship 12 times, the premier events in the UK of each code. He is the current AC World champion.

He was ranked 29th in the 100 Best Sportspeople in the World for the year 2020 by Sports Media. He enjoys a rivalry with Robert Fulford, whom he has faced in eleven British AC Open singles finals.

He is a businessman and qualified Chartered Accountant (after completing his articles at Deloitte SA in 1992), who founded and runs Sable International, a company that offer services to expats and high-net-worth individuals. He is known throughout the Antipodean and South African communities in London. He has two sons and is married to Adrienne.

Career statistics (Association Croquet)

Major tournament performance timeline

Major Championship Finals: 30 (21 titles, 9 runners-up) 

The 2001 World Championship and Open Championship were a combined event.

References

English croquet players
Living people
1967 births